The International Union of Crystallography (IUCr) is an organisation devoted to the international promotion and coordination of the science of crystallography. The IUCr is a member of the International Council for Science (ICSU).

Objectives 
The objectives of the IUCr are to promote international cooperation in crystallography and to contribute to all aspects of crystallography, to promote international publication of crystallographic research, to facilitate standardization of methods, units, nomenclatures and symbols, and to form a focus for the relations of crystallography to other sciences.

The IUCr fulfils these objectives by publishing in print and electronically primary scientific journals through the Acta Crystallographica journal series, as well as Journal of Applied Crystallography, Journal of Synchrotron Radiation, IUCrJ, the series of reference volumes International Tables for Crystallography, distributing the quarterly IUCr Newsletter, maintaining the online World Directory/Database of Crystallographers, awarding the Ewald Prize and organising the triennial Congress and General Assembly.

History 

In 1944 the yearly meeting of the X-ray Analysis Group (XRAG) of the UK Institute of Physics was held in Oxford, and the distinguished German crystallographer Paul Peter Ewald, who then taught at Queen's University Belfast, was invited to give the evening lecture. In it he gave a historical survey of some of the stages in the evolution of X-ray crystallography and ended with a strong plea for the formation of an international society or union which would represent, and unify publication for, the new science. This idea was followed up by the British crystallographers, and particularly by Sir Lawrence Bragg, the Chairman of XRAG. In June 1946, within a year of the termination of fighting in WWII, he arranged for an international meeting of crystallographers in London which was attended by some 120 scientists from most of the allied countries. In that London meeting Ewald was elected Chairman of the Provisional International Crystallographic Committee, which put into action the decision to form the International Union of Crystallography. Sir Lawrence Bragg was the first formally elected President of this IUCr, with Ralph Walter Graystone Wyckoff and Arne Westgren  as Vice-Presidents. Ewald was elected as 5th President of the IUCr, the 'international society or union' that he had originally conceived, in 1960.

IUCr Symmetry notation 
The IUCr notation is the notation for the symmetry group adopted by the International Union of Crystallography in 1952. It identifies members of the Wallpaper group with a 4 character name. First it has a P or C for primitive or centered groups. Groups are denoted by a number 1, 2, 3, 4, or 6 for the highest order of symmetry. Groups can have one or two reflections, denoted as vertical mirrors first (horizontal reflection), and horizontal second (vertical reflection). A simple reflection is denoted by an m (mirror), and a glide-reflection is denoted by a g. Place holder 1 denotes an orthogonal direction with no reflections.

See also
Acta Crystallographica
X-ray crystallography
Crystallography
International Year of Crystallography
Open Access Scholarly Publishers Association, of which IUCr is a member
 British Crystallographic Association
 American Crystallographic Association
 German Crystallographic Society

References

External links 
 International Union of Crystallography Home Page

Members of the International Council for Science
International scientific organizations
Crystallography organizations
Scientific organizations established in 1948
International organisations based in the United Kingdom
Organisations based in Cheshire
Members of the International Science Council